The Holy and Great Monastery of Vatopedi is an Eastern Orthodox monastery on Mount Athos, Greece.    The monastery was expanded several times during its history, particularly during the Byzantine period and in the 18th and 19th centuries.  More than 120 monks live in the monastery.

History
Vatopedi was built on the site of an early Christian settlement dating from Late Antiquity. In 2000, the Ephorate of Byzantine Antiquities excavated the foundations of an early Christian basilica to the north of the current katholikon of Vatopedi.

Vatopedi was founded in the second half of the 10th century by three monks, Athanasius, Nicholas, and Antonius, from Adrianople, who were disciples of Athanasius the Athonite. By the end of the 15th century, the Russian pilgrim Isaiah wrote that the monastery was Greek.

In 1990, Vatopedi was converted from an idiorrhythmic monastery into a cenobitic one.

Sketes attached to Vatopedi
Two large sketes (monastic style communities) are attached to Vatopedi: the Skete of Saint Andrew in Karyes and the Skete of Saint Demetrius near the main monastery. Other kellia (κελλιά; small monasteries which are not independent) are also dependent on the monastery. Some of the kellia in the area of the main monastery compound include:

Ag. Efthymiou
Ag. Panton
Ag. Grigorios Palamas
Ag. Charalampos
Ag. Christoforos
Ag. Archangeli
Ag. Evdokimos
Xylourgio
Ag. Onoufrios
Palia Athoniada
Pente Martyres
Profiti Ilia

Main buildings within the walls of the monastery
The Katholikon (primary church), dedicated to the Annunciation of the Theotokos (Virgin Mary)
The Refectory, or trapeza
The Byzantine period clock tower
The 10th century NE tower which now houses the monastery's library

Extensive construction projects are underway to restore the monastery's larger buildings.

Treasures held within the monastery
The Monastery of Vatopedi holds the Cincture of the Theotokos, a belt held by some believers to be the actual belt of the Theotokos, which she wore on earth and gave to Thomas the Apostle after her death and during her transition to heaven (the equivalent in the Western Church is the Girdle of Thomas). The silver and jewel-encrusted reliquary containing the skull of St. John Chrysostom is kept in the Monastery and is credited by Eastern Orthodox Christians with miraculous healings. The monastery also contains the Iaspis, a chalice fashioned of a single piece of the precious stone jasper, and numerous icons.

Vatopedi's library preserves a medieval royal charter, the 13th-century Vatopedi Charter of Ivan Asen II of Bulgaria dedicated to the monastery. It was discovered in the monastery's archives in 1929.

The library holds 2,000 manuscripts and 35,000 printed books. Among manuscripts from Vatopedi are Uncial 063, Uncial 0102, and the Vatopedi Psalter in the British Library and the early-14th century Codex Vatopedinus 655 divided between the British Library and the French Bibliothèque Nationale, which includes numerous peripluses, extracts from Strabo and Ptolemy's geographical works, and early maps.

 Other manuscripts
 Minuscules 245 & 464
 Lectionaries 54 & 55

Land deal controversy 
In September 2008, the monastery was implicated in an alleged real estate scandal (see also the Greek Wikipedia article). The monastery was accused of trading low-value land for high-value state property in a deal with the New Democracy government of Prime Minister Kostas Karamanlis. In the ensuing court case, all of the accused were ultimately acquitted and it was decided that there was no financial damage to the public treasury.

American writer Michael Lewis reports that a Greek parliamentary commission estimated the value of government property received by the monastery at one billion euros. Michael Lewis, in his book Boomerang: Travels in the New Third World, visits the monastery, details the frugal, hard-working lifestyle of the monks and investigates the real estate deal which would have helped in efforts to restore Vatopedi to its former glory.

After the story became public in August 2008, the government cancelled the land deals and two ministers resigned, under huge pressure from the media and public. Additionally, Parliament voted unanimously to set up a commission to investigate the deal. However, after investigations, the estimations of the public agencies for the exchanged real estate objects were found to have been in order.

In December 2010, a Court of Appeals found guilty and imposed a ten-month imprisonment (with three years suspension) to ex-judge Maria Psaltis on charges of misconduct and violations of judicial secrecy. The same penalty was issued to Abbot Ephraim and monk Arsenios on instigation. Finally Abbot Ephraim, monk Arsenios and the judge Maria Psaltis were relived from the accusation from Areios Pagos, the Supreme Court of the Hellenic Republic (Greece), by the act 966/2012.

As of December 2011, 3 years after the reveal of the alleged scandal, none of the two different investigating parliamentary commissions and various trials had found any of the persons involved guilty of illegal money transactions or real estate fraud. Then, in late December 2011, Abbot Ephraim was arrested, and jailed pending trial, for alleged fraud and embezzlement.

On January 11, 2012, the Criminal Division of the Supreme Court accepted the proposal of the Deputy Prosecutor of the Supreme Court Law Mr. Tsangas: it set aside the decision under which Psaltis, Ephraim, and Arsenios had each been sentenced to 10-month imprisonment (with three years suspended). The Supreme Court considered that the contested decision of the Court of Appeals had no legal justification and presented logical gaps, inconsistencies, and shortcomings. Moreover, the Supreme Court ruling that any disclosure of the outcome of the conference only a court is no longer a criminal offense [sic], which means that the three defendants will be treated under more favorable conditions when judged again by the court.

In October 2013, it was reported that fourteen persons, including Abbot Efrem and monk Arsenios were indicted on several counts including money laundering related to the Land Deal Controversy, which has been referred to as the "holy exchange".

On 23 March 2017, Efrem was fully acquitted. On 28 May 2021, Efrem was hospitalized in Athens due to a COVID-19 infection.

Miracle-working icons within the monastery
There are seven icons of the Mother of God in the monastery purported by believers to be miracle-working: Elaiovrytissa, Ktetorissa (Vimatarissa), Esphagmeni, Pantanassa, Pyrovolitheisa, Antiphonitria and Paramythia.

See also
Athonite Academy
Ephraim of Vatopedi
Joseph of Vatopedi

References

Sources

External links 

 Monastery Vatopedi - The official website of Monastery Vatopedi
 The Ascetic Experience: photo galleries hosted by the Monastery of Vatopedi
 Pemptousia (Πεμπτουσία), a magazine published by the Association of the Friends of Vatopaidi Monastery

 
Monasteries on Mount Athos
Byzantine monasteries in Greece
Christian monasteries established in the 10th century
Political scandals in Greece
Greek Orthodox monasteries
10th-century establishments in Greece